Joe Ewing Estes (October 24, 1903 – October 24, 1989) was a United States district judge of the United States District Court for the Northern District of Texas.

Education and career

Born in Commerce, Texas, Estes received a Bachelor of Laws from the University of Texas School of Law in 1927. He was in private practice in Commerce from 1928 to 1930, and then in Fort Worth, Texas until 1942. He served in the United States Naval Reserve during World War II, from 1942 to 1945, achieving the rank of Lieutenant. He thereafter returned to private practice, in Dallas, Texas from 1946 to 1955.

Federal judicial service

On July 18, 1955, Estes was nominated by President Dwight D. Eisenhower to a seat on the United States District Court for the Northern District of Texas vacated by Judge William H. Atwell. Estes was confirmed by the United States Senate on July 28, 1955, and received his commission on August 1, 1955. He served as Chief Judge from 1959 to 1972 and as a member of the Judicial Conference of the United States from 1969 to 1971. He assumed senior status on July 1, 1972. He served as a Judge of the Temporary Emergency Court of Appeals from 1972 to 1987. He remained in senior status until his death on October 24, 1989, his 86th birthday.

References

Sources
 

1903 births
1989 deaths
Judges of the United States District Court for the Northern District of Texas
United States district court judges appointed by Dwight D. Eisenhower
20th-century American judges
United States Navy officers
20th-century American lawyers
People from Commerce, Texas
People from Fort Worth, Texas
Military personnel from Texas